Dr. Jean L. Okimāsis (born Jean Lillian Littlechief) is a Cree linguist who has worked on teaching and documenting the Plains Cree language.

Career 
In 1982, Okimāsis started work on Cree language programs at the Saskatchewan Indian Federated college (now the First Nations University of Canada). She published a textbook, workbook, and teaching grammar of the Cree language called Cree, Language of the Plains, which is  publicly available under a Creative commons license.

Okimāsis has been instrumental in developing and promoting the use of the standard Roman orthography for writing the Cree language. In 2008, she cowrote How to Spell it in Cree (The Standard Roman Orthography) with Arok Wolvengrey.

Recognition 
Okimāsis received the YWCA Woman of Distinction Award in 2000, and an honorary doctorate from the University of Regina in 2005.

In 2019, a park was named after Okimāsis in Regina.

See also 
Arok Wolvengrey
Solomon Ratt

References

Bibliography

External links 
Jean Okimāsis on the University of Regina Press
Cree: Language of the Plains / nēhiyawēwin: paskwāwi-pīkiskwēwin

1938 births
Living people
Linguists from Canada
Women linguists
University of Regina alumni
Linguists of Algic languages